The women's 800 metre freestyle competition at the 2018 Mediterranean Games was held on 23 June 2018 at the Campclar Aquatic Center.

Records 
Prior to this competition, the existing world and Mediterranean Games records were as follows:

Results 
The heats were held at 09:30 and 17:30.

References 

Women's 800 metre freestyle
2018 in women's swimming